The 2006 Formula 3 Sudamericana season was the 20th Formula 3 Sudamericana season. It began on 26 March 2006, at  Autódromo Internacional de Curitiba in and ended on 26 November at Autódromo José Carlos Pace in São Paulo. Brazilian driver Luiz Razia won the title.

Drivers and teams
 All drivers competed in Pirelli-shod. All teams were Brazilian registered

References

External links
 Official website

Formula 3 Sudamericana
Sudamericana
Formula 3 Sudamericana seasons
Sudamericana F3